Vimael Machín (born September 25, 1993) is a Puerto Rican professional baseball infielder in the Philadelphia Phillies organization. He has played in Major League Baseball (MLB) for the Oakland Athletics.

Career

Amateur
Machín attended Puerto Rico Baseball Academy and High School in Gurabo, Puerto Rico. He was drafted by the San Diego Padres in the 29th round of the 2011 MLB draft, but did not sign. He attended Virginia Commonwealth University and played four year of college baseball for the VCU Rams. In 2014, he played collegiate summer baseball with the Danbury Westerners of the New England Collegiate Baseball League and the  Bourne Braves of the Cape Cod Baseball League.

Chicago Cubs
He was drafted by the Chicago Cubs in the 10th round of the 2015 MLB draft and signed with them.

Machín split the 2015 season between the Eugene Emeralds and South Bend Cubs, hitting a combined .181/.270/.222/.492 with 10 RBI. He split the 2016 season between Eugene, South Bend, and the Iowa Cubs, hitting a combined .267/.377/.311/.688 with 17 RBI. He split the 2017 season between South Bend and the Myrtle Beach Pelicans, hitting a combined .303/.360/.438/.798 with 11 home runs and 72 RBI. He split the 2018 season between Myrtle Beach and the Tennessee Smokies, hitting a combined .217/.343/.325/.668 with 7 home runs and 42 RBI. He split the 2019 season between Tennessee and Iowa, hitting a combined .295/.390/.412/.802 with 7 home runs and 62 RBI.

Oakland Athletics
On December 12, 2019, Machín was selected by the Philadelphia Phillies in the 2019 Rule 5 draft, and traded to the Oakland Athletics in exchange for cash considerations. Machin made his major league debut on July 26, 2020 against the Los Angeles Angels, going hitless in 3 at-bats. On April 3, 2022, Machin was outrighted to Triple-A. He was designated for assignment on December 12, 2022.  He elected free agency on December 18, 2022.

Philadelphia Phillies
On January 12, 2023, Machín signed a minor league contract with the Philadelphia Phillies organization.

References

External links

VCU Rams bio

1993 births
Living people
Major League Baseball players from Puerto Rico
Major League Baseball infielders
Oakland Athletics players
VCU Rams baseball players
Bourne Braves players
Eugene Emeralds players
People from Humacao, Puerto Rico
South Bend Cubs players
Iowa Cubs players
Myrtle Beach Pelicans players
Tennessee Smokies players
Las Vegas Aviators players
Criollos de Caguas players
Liga de Béisbol Profesional Roberto Clemente infielders
2023 World Baseball Classic players